Michael Wollny (born 25 May 1978) is a German jazz pianist and a professor at the Hochschule für Musik und Theater Leipzig. He has played with international musicians including Joachim Kühn, Tamar Halperin, Marius Neset, Andreas Schaerer, Émile Parisien and Vincent Peirani, and recorded award-winning albums. In his Michael Wollny Trio, he has played with percussionist  and bassist Tim Lefebvre.

Education 
Wollny took piano and violin lessons at the Musikschule Schweinfurt and at the Hermann Zilcher Conservatory in Würzburg until 1997, successfully competing in the Jugend musiziert. He took the artistic diploma with distinction in 2002, and the master classes diploma in 2004. He also studied with John Taylor and Walter Norris.

Career 
From 1998 to 2002, Wollny was a member of the touring . Wollny's debut album was recorded with Wolfgang Kriener and Joachim Leyh. Wollny has played with Heinz Sauer from 2001 both as a duo and in a quartet. He was also a member of the trio , with bassist Eva Kruse and percussionist . He was a regular pianist at the Staatstheater Nürnberg and the Nationaltheater Mannheim from 1999.

In 2005 Wollny signed a contract with the label ACT Music + Vision on which he released several albums with his trio and in collaboration with other artists, such as Sauer and Nils Landgren. In 2007 he released his first solo album Hexentanz. In 2014 his trio, now with bassist Tim Lefebvre, recorded the album Weltentraum, which made the pop charts. A review in The Guardian noted "They are one of the world's great jazz-driven piano trios, and Nachtfahrten takes nothing away from this assessment." In 2017, he was an artist in residence (Fokus Jazz: Michael Wollny) of the Rheingau Musik Festival, interviewed in a Rendezvous, and playing three concerts, improvising with Marius Neset in the first, with vocalist Andreas Schaerer, Émile Parisien and Vincent Peirani in the second, and finally with his trio and the Norwegian Wind Ensemble.

Since 2014 Wollny has lived with his family in Leipzig, where he is a professor at the Hochschule für Musik und Theater Leipzig.

Awards 

Wollny has been awarded several scholarships and prizes, including the cultural prize of Schweinfurt in 2003, and in 2005 both the Preis der Deutschen Schallplattenkritik (for Melancholia with Heinz Sauer) and the Bayerischer Kunstförderpreis. He was awarded the Echo Jazz in the category Instrumentalist/in des Jahres national - Piano/Keyboards in 2010 when the prize was awarded for the first time.

The trio received Ronnie Scott's Jazz Award as Most Promising International Newcomer of the Year in London in May 2007. The trio received the Echo Jazz as ensemble of the year. In 2015 and 2016 he was again awarded the Echo Jazz.

Discography 

Recordings with Wollny have included:
 Wollny / Kriener / Leyh: CDNR3 (2001)
 Heinz Sauer / Michael Wollny: Melancholia (2004)
 Young Friends: Great German Song Book (2005)
 Wollny / Kruse / Schaefer: Call it [em] (2005)
 Heinz Sauer / Michael Wollny: Certain Beauty (2006)
 Michael Wollny: Piano Works VII: Hexentanz (2007)
 Wollny / Kruse / Schaefer: [em] 3 (2008)
 Joachim Kühn / Michael Wollny: live at Schloss Elmau (2009)
 Michael Wollny / Tamar Halperin: Wunderkammer (2009)
 Wollny / Kruse / Schaefer: [em] LIVE (2010)
 Nils Landgren: The Moon, the Stars and You, with Richard Galliano, Lars Danielsson, Joe Sample, Michael Wollny, Rasmus Kihlberg, Steve Gadd & Stockholm Philharmonic Orchestra (2011)
 Nils Landgren / Michael Wollny: Fragile At Schloss Elmau (2011)
 Wollny / Kruse / Schaefer: [em] Wasted & Wanted (2012)
 Heinz Sauer / Michael Wollny: Don't Explain - Live in Concert (2013)
 Iiro Rantala / Leszek Możdżer / Michael Wollny: Jazz at Berlin Philharmonie I (2013)
 Vincent Peirani with Michael Wollny & Michel Benita: Thrill Box (2013)
 Michael Wollny Trio: Weltentraum (2014) (2014: Goldene Schallplatte, Jazz Award), Preis der deutschen Schallplattenkritik)
 Michael Wollny with Christian Weber and Eric Schaefer: Nachtfahrten (2015) (2015: Gold, Deutschland, Jazz Award)
 Michael Wollny Trio in Concert: Klangspuren (2016)
 Michael Wollny & Vincent Peirani: Tandem (2016)
 Michael Wollny Trio feat. The Norwegian Wind Ensemble and Geir Lysne: Oslo (2018)
 Michael Wollny Trio: Wartburg (2018)
 Michael Wollny: Mondenkind (2020)
 Michael Wollny with Emile Parisien, Tim Lefebvre & Christian Lillinger: XXXX (2021)

References

External links 
 Official website
 
 
 Michael Wollny at All About Jazz
 Profile at www.thejazzman.com
 Michael Wollny / Biografie (in German) ACT
 Wollny / Kruse / Schaefer

German jazz pianists
German jazz composers
Male jazz composers
ACT Music artists
Academic staff of the University of Music and Theatre Leipzig
People from Schweinfurt
1978 births
Living people
German male pianists
21st-century pianists
21st-century German male musicians